Parliamentary elections were held in Zimbabwe on 8 and 9 April 1995 to elect members to the House of Assembly of Zimbabwe. The ruling Zimbabwe African National Union - Patriotic Front won an overwhelming majority of the seats. There were 120 constituencies but 55 members were returned unopposed. The elections were not free and fair, as the authoritarian ZANU-PF party abused election rules and intimated the opposition. 

The elections occurred under the context of controversial constitutional changes and a disastrous economic structural adjustment programme.

Results
There were 4,803,866 registered voters across the country, but 2,214,358 were in uncontested constituencies.

By constituency

References

Zimbabwe
Elections in Zimbabwe
1995 in Zimbabwe